Saint-Pierre-de-Vassols (Provençal: Sant Pèire de Vassòus) is a commune in the Vaucluse département in the Provence-Alpes-Côte d'Azur region of southeastern France. Its inhabitants are known as vassoliens (male) and vassoliennes (female).

It is the birthplace of Blaise Francois Pagan (1603-1665), a French soldier and military engineer. His work, Les Fortifications, was the dominant text of its era on military fortifications and a significant influence on Sébastien Le Prestre de Vauban.

The village is located near Mont Ventoux, often used as a stage on the Tour de France. It is one of the toughest climbs in professional cycling, and British cyclist Tom Simpson died here in 1967. Other tourist attractions include a caravan site.

See also
Communes of the Vaucluse department

References

Communes of Vaucluse